In mathematics, the indefinite orthogonal group,  is the Lie group of all linear transformations of an n-dimensional real vector space that leave invariant a nondegenerate, symmetric bilinear form of signature , where . It is also called the pseudo-orthogonal group or generalized orthogonal group.

The indefinite special orthogonal group,  is the subgroup of  consisting of all elements with determinant 1.

The signature of the form determines the group up to isomorphism; interchanging p with q amounts to replacing the metric by its negative, and so gives the same group. If either p or q equals zero, then the group is isomorphic to the ordinary orthogonal group O(n). We assume in what follows that both p and q are positive.

The group  is defined for vector spaces over the reals. For complex spaces, all groups  are isomorphic to the usual orthogonal group , since the transform  changes the signature of a form. This should not be confused with the indefinite unitary group  which preserves a sesquilinear form of signature .

In even dimension ,  is known as the split orthogonal group.

Examples 

The basic example is the squeeze mappings, which is the group  of (the identity component of) linear transforms preserving the unit hyperbola. Concretely, these are the matrices  and can be interpreted as hyperbolic rotations, just as the group SO(2) can be interpreted as circular rotations.

In physics, the Lorentz group  is of central importance, being the setting for electromagnetism and special relativity.

Matrix definition
One can define  as a group of matrices, just as for the classical orthogonal group O(n). Consider the  diagonal matrix  given by

,

We then define  to be the group of  matrices that preserve this bilinear form:
.

More explicitly,  consists of matrices  such that
,

One obtains an isomorphic group (indeed, a conjugate subgroup of ) by replacing g with any symmetric matrix with p positive eigenvalues and q negative ones. Diagonalizing this matrix gives a conjugation of this group with the standard group .

Subgroups

The group  and related subgroups of  can be described algebraically.

where A, B, C, and D are p×p, p×q, q×p, and q×q blocks, respectively. It can be shown that the set of matrices in  whose upper-left p×p block A has positive determinant is a subgroup. Or, to put it another way, if

The analogous result for the bottom-right q×q block also holds.

Topology
Assuming both p and q are positive, neither of the groups  nor  are connected, having four and two components respectively.
 is the Klein four-group, with each factor being whether an element preserves or reverses the respective orientations on the p and q dimensional subspaces on which the form is definite; note that reversing orientation on only one of these subspaces reverses orientation on the whole space. The special orthogonal group has components }, each of which either preserves both orientations or reverses both orientations, in either case preserving the overall orientation.

This notation is related to the notation  for the orthochronous Lorentz group, where the + refers to preserving the orientation on the first (temporal) dimension.

The group  is also not compact, but contains the compact subgroups O(p) and O(q) acting on the subspaces on which the form is definite.
Thus, the spaces are homotopy equivalent to products of (special) orthogonal groups, from which algebro-topological invariants can be computed. (See Maximal compact subgroup.)

{| border="1" cellpadding="11" style="border-collapse: collapse; border: 1px #aaa solid;"
!style="background:#efefef;"| π1(SO+(p, q))
!style="background:#efefef;"| p = 1
!style="background:#efefef;"| p = 2
!style="background:#efefef;"| p ≥ 3
|-
!style="background:#efefef;"| q = 1
| C1 || Z || C2
|-
!style="background:#efefef;"| q = 2
| Z || Z × Z
 || Z × C2
|-
!style="background:#efefef;"| q ≥ 3
| C2 || C2 × Z
 || C2 × C2
|}

Split orthogonal group
In even dimensions, the middle group  is known as the split orthogonal group, and is of particular interest, as it occurs as the group of T-duality transformations in string theory, for example. It is the split Lie group corresponding to the complex Lie algebra so2n (the Lie group of the split real form of the Lie algebra); more precisely, the identity component is the split Lie group, as non-identity components cannot be reconstructed from the Lie algebra. In this sense it is opposite to the definite orthogonal group , which is the compact real form of the complex Lie algebra.

The case  corresponds to the multiplicative group of the split-complex numbers.

In terms of being a group of Lie type – i.e., construction of an algebraic group from a Lie algebra – split orthogonal groups are Chevalley groups, while the non-split orthogonal groups require a slightly more complicated construction, and are Steinberg groups.

Split orthogonal groups are used to construct the generalized flag variety over non-algebraically closed fields.

See also
Orthogonal group
Lorentz group
Poincaré group
Symmetric bilinear form

References

 
Anthony Knapp, Lie Groups Beyond an Introduction, Second Edition, Progress in Mathematics, vol. 140, Birkhäuser, Boston, 2002.  – see page 372 for a description of the indefinite orthogonal group

Joseph A. Wolf, Spaces of constant curvature, (1967) page. 335.

Lie groups